Mariana Morais (born May 3, 1995) is a Brazilian female mixed martial artist who competes in the Bantamweight division. From April 2020 to October 2020, Fight Matrix had Morais ranked within the top 10 of the rankings for Women's Featherweight+, rising to as high as #9.

Mixed martial arts career

Early career

Starting her career in 2012, Morais compiled a 9-2 record on the regional Brazilian scene before she was signed to Invicta Fighting Championships as a 19 year old.

In her one fight at the time in the promotion, Morais faced Roxanne Modafferi at Invicta FC 14: Evinger vs. Kianzad on September 12, 2015, and lost via TKO stoppage in the third round.

Returning to the regional Brazilian scene, Morais won 3 out the next 4 bouts, losing only to future UFC fighter Karol Rosa via unanimous decision.

Morais faced Ariane Lipski on October 22, 2017 at KSW 40 for the KSW Women's Flyweight Championship. She lost via rear-naked choke less than a minute into the first round.

Morais faced Vanessa Porto on January 13, 2018 at Invicta FC 27: Kaufman vs. Kianzad.  She lost the fight via a rear-naked choke on round one.

Morais would then lose the next 4 out of 6 bouts on the regional Brazilian scene, including for the Shooto Brazil Women's Bantamweight Championship at Shooto Brasil 81 against  Lara Fritzen via unanimous decision. One of the bouts she did win was for the NCE Flyweight Championship.

Morais competed in the one night Shooto Brasil Women's Lightweight Grand Prix on March 1, 2020, with the winner gaining a contract for the 2021 Professional Fighters League season. Morais started the event by facing Dayana Silva, from Nova União. In a tough fight, she won by split decision. She qualified for the final, where she faced Bianca Daimoni, from Chute Boxe, who had beaten Yana Gadelha in the semifinal. The São Paulo fighter needed less than two minutes to knock out Daimoni, in a straightforward exchange of blows.

Professional Fighters League
Morais was announced to be participating in the PFL for the 2021 season, and faced Kayla Harrison on May 6, 2021 at PFL 3. She lost the bout via TKO in the first round.

Morais faced Kaitlin Young on June 25, 2021 at PFL 6. She won the close bout via split decision.

Although she was eliminated from championship contention, she was scheduled to face Zamzagul Fayzallanova on August 19, 2021 at PFL 8. However, Zamzagul has to pull out of the bout and she was replaced by Claudia Zamora. After Larissa Pacheco was removed the tournament due to weight cut issues, Morais, who finished fifth in final standings, was reinstated as a replacement to face Taylor Guardado in the Semifinals off the Women's Lightweight tournament on August 19, 2021 at PFL 8. She lost the back-and-forth bout via split decision.

Championships and accomplishments

Mixed martial arts 
 New Corpore Extreme
 NCE Flyweight Championship

Mixed martial arts record

|-
|Win
|align=center|18–12
|Abril Anguiano
|Submission (rear-naked choke)
|Peak Fighting 25
|
|align=center|1
|align=center|3:19
|Hinton, Oklahoma, United States
|
|-
|Loss
|align=center|17–12
|Taylor Guardado
|Decision (split)
|PFL 8 
|
|align=center|3
|align=center|5:00
|Hollywood, Florida, United States
|
|-
| Win
| align=center| 17–11
|Kaitlin Young
|Decision (split)
|PFL 6
|
|align=center|3
|align=center|5:00
|Atlantic City, New Jersey, United States
|
|-
|Loss
|align=center|16–11
|Kayla Harrison
|TKO (punches)
|PFL 3
|
|align=center|1
|align=center|1:23
|Atlantic City, New Jersey, United States
|
|-
| Win
| align=center| 16–10
| Bianca Daimoni
|KO (punches)
|rowspan=2|Shooto Brasil: Grand Prix
|rowspan=2|
|align=center|1
|align=center|1:19
|rowspan=2|Rio de Janeiro, Brazil
|
|-
| Win
| align=center|15–10
|Dayana Silva
| Decision (split)
| align=center| 3
| align=center| 5:00
|
|-
| Win
| align=center|14–10
| Sidy Rocha
|Decision (unanimous)
|Shooto Brazil 99
|
| align=center| 3
| align=center| 5:00
|Rio de Janeiro, Brazil
|
|-
| Loss
| align=center| 13–10
| Vanessa Melo
|Decision (split)
|Future FC 5
|
|align=center|3
|align=center|5:00
|São Paulo, Brazil
|
|-
| Loss
| align=center| 13–9
| Norma Dumont
| Decision (majority)
| Shooto Brazil 86
| 
| align=center| 3
| align=center| 5:00
| Rio de Janeiro, Brazil
|
|-
| Loss
| align=center| 13–8
| Daiane Firmino
| Submission (arm-triangle choke)
| Standout Fighting Tournament 3
| 
| align=center| 3
| align=center| 1:04
| São Paulo, Brazil
| 
|-
| Win
| align=center| 13–7
|Núbia Nascimento
|Decision (unanimous)
|New Corpore Extreme 26
|
| align=center| 3
| align=center| 5:00
|Rio de Janeiro, Brazil
|
|-
| Loss
| align=center|12–7
| Lara Fritzen
| Decision (unanimous)
| Shooto Brasil 81
| 
| align=center| 3
| align=center| 5:00
| Rio de Janeiro, Brazil
| 
|-
| Loss
| align=center| 12–6
| Vanessa Porto
| Submission (rear-naked choke)
| Invicta FC 27: Kaufman vs. Kianzad
| 
| align=center| 1
| align=center| 4:19
| Kansas City, Missouri, United States
|
|-
| Loss
| align=center|12–5
| Ariane Lipski
|Submission (rear-naked choke)
|KSW 40
|
|align=center| 1
|align=center| 0:58
|Dublin, Ireland
|
|-
| Win
| align=center| 12–4
| Vitória Ferreira
| TKO (punches)
|Curitiba Top Fight 11
|
| align=center|2
| align=center|4:15
|Curitiba, Brazil
|
|-
| Win
| align=center| 11–4
|Jéssica Suelem
| Submission (rear-naked choke)
|Curitiba Top Fight 10
|
|align=center|1
|align=center|1:03
|Curitiba, Brazil
|
|-
| Loss
| align=center|10–4
|Karol Rosa
| Decision (unanimous)
| HCC The Start 4
| 
| align=center| 3
| align=center| 5:00
| Vila Velha, Brazil
|
|-
| Win
| align=center| 10–3
| Laisa Coimbra
|Submission (arm-triangle choke)
|Floripa Fight Girls
|
|align=center|1
|align=center|1:23
|Florianópolis, Brazil
|
|-
| Loss
| align=center| 9–3
|Roxanne Modafferi
| TKO (punches)
| Invicta FC 14: Evinger vs. Kianzad
| 
| align=center | 3
| align=center | 4:40
| Kansas City, Missouri, United States
|
|-
| Win
| align=center|9–2
| Marta Souza
|Submission (armbar)
|MMA Leones: Clevinho vs. Fiel
|
|align=center| 2
|align=center| 2:04
|Fazenda Rio Grande, Brazil
|
|-
| Win
| align=center|8–2
| Cristina Mejia
| Decision (unanimous)
|Peru FC 19
|
| align=center|3
| align=center|5:00
|Lima, Peru
|
|-
| Win
| align=center|7–2
| Stephanie Bragayrac
| Submission (arm-triangle choke)
|Explosion MMA 4
|
|align=center|2
|align=center|N/A
|Curitiba, Brazil
| 
|-
| Win
| align=center| 6–2
| Geisyele Nascimento
| Submission (armbar)
| Striker's House Cup 43
| 
| align=center| 1
| align=center| 2:12
| Curitiba, Brazil
| 
|-
| Win
| align=center| 5–2
| Gisele Cardoso
|Submission (rear-naked choke)
|Sao Jose Top Fight 1
|
|align=center| 1
|align=center| 0:52
|São José dos Pinhais, Brazil
|
|-
| Loss
| align=center| 4–2
|Luciana Pereira
|Decision (unanimous)
|Shooto Brasil 49
|
|align=center|3
|align=center|5:00
|Rio de Janeiro, Brazil
|
|-
| Loss
| align=center|4–1
|Jennifer Maia
| Submission (rear-naked choke)
| Circuito Talent de MMA 9
| 
|align=center|2
|align=center|2:18
| São José dos Pinhais, Brazil
|
|-
| Win
| align=center| 4–0
| Mariana Leonardo
|Submission (straight armbar)
|Circuito Talent de MMA 8
|
|align=center|1
|align=center|0:44
|Valinhos, Brazil
|
|-
| Win
| align=center|3–0
| Margarete Soares
|Submission (guillotine choke)
| Pocos Fight MMA 2
|
| align=center|1
| align=center|3:54
|Poços de Caldas, Brazil
|
|-
| Win
| align=center| 2–0
| Bruna Godoy
| TKO (punches)
|Explosive MMA Fighter 4
|
| align=center|1
| align=center|0:40
|São Simão, Brazil
|
|-
| Win
| align=center|1–0
| Juliana Cristina
| TKO (punches)
|Explosive MMA Fighter
|
|align=center|1
|align=center|1:40
|São Simão, Brazil
|

See also 
 List of female mixed martial artists

References

External links 
 Mariana Morais at PFL
 

1995 births
Living people
Brazilian female mixed martial artists
Lightweight mixed martial artists
LGBT mixed martial artists
People from São João da Boa Vista